Negele Oscar Knight (born March 6, 1967) is an American former professional basketball player who played six National Basketball Association (NBA) seasons for the Phoenix Suns, San Antonio Spurs, Portland Trail Blazers, Detroit Pistons and Toronto Raptors. Knight was selected by the Suns in the second round (31st pick overall) of the 1990 NBA draft. Knight's best year as a professional came during the 1993-94 season as a member of the Spurs, when he appeared in 64 games averaging 9.3 ppg. He played collegiately at the University of Dayton.

College career
In 1990, Knight was named the tournament MVP after Dayton defeated Xavier 98–89 to clinch an NCAA tournament berth. Knight then scored 27 points in the first round of the 1990 NCAA Division I men's basketball tournament as Dayton team upset the higher-seeded Illinois Fighting Illini 88–86. He is a member of the Dayton All-Century team.

Professional career
Knight's trade from the Suns to the Spurs during the 1993 NBA offseason caused the Houston Rockets to complain publicly about the trade. Knight would end up as a starter for the Spurs in 1993-94.

External links
NBA stats @ basketballreference.com

References

1967 births
Living people
American expatriate basketball people in Canada
American expatriate basketball people in France
American expatriate basketball people in Switzerland
American men's basketball players
Basketball players from Detroit
Dayton Flyers men's basketball players
Detroit Pistons players
Phoenix Suns draft picks
Phoenix Suns players
Point guards
Portland Trail Blazers players
San Antonio Spurs players
Saint Martin de Porres High School (Detroit) alumni
Toronto Raptors players